The Highway of Death ( ṭarīq al-mawt) is a six-lane highway between Kuwait and Iraq, officially known as Highway 80. It runs from Kuwait City to the border town of Safwan in Iraq and then on to the Iraqi city of Basra. The road was used by Iraqi armored divisions for the 1990 invasion of Kuwait. It was repaired after the Gulf War and used by U.S. and British forces in the initial stages of the 2003 invasion of Iraq.

During the American-led coalition offensive in the Persian Gulf War, American, Canadian, British and French aircraft and ground forces attacked retreating Iraqi military personnel attempting to leave Kuwait on the night of February 26–27, 1991, resulting in the destruction of hundreds of vehicles and the deaths of many of their occupants. Between 1,400 and 2,000 vehicles were hit or abandoned on the main Highway 80 north of Al Jahra.

The scenes of devastation on the road are some of the most recognizable images of the war, and it has been suggested that they were a factor in President George H. W. Bush's decision to declare a cessation of hostilities the next day. Many Iraqi forces successfully escaped across the Euphrates river, and the U.S. Defense Intelligence Agency estimated that upwards of 70,000 to 80,000 troops from defeated divisions in Kuwait might have fled into Basra, evading capture.

Highway 80

The attack began when A-6 Intruder attack jets of the United States Marine Corps' 3rd Marine Aircraft Wing blocked the head and tail of the column on Highway 80, bombarding a massive vehicle column of mostly Iraqi Regular Army forces with Mk-20 Rockeye II cluster bombs, effectively boxing in the Iraqi forces in an enormous traffic jam as the turkey shoot began in earnest, setting up targets for subsequent airstrikes. Over the next 10 hours, scores of U.S. Marine and U.S. Air Force aircraft and U.S. Navy pilots from USS Ranger (CV/CVA-61) attacked the convoy using a variety of weapons. Vehicles surviving the air attacks were later engaged by arriving coalition ground units, while most of the vehicles that managed to evade the traffic jam and continued to drive on the road north were targeted individually. The road bottle-neck near the Mutla Ridge police station was reduced to a long uninterrupted line of more than 300 stuck and abandoned vehicles sometimes called the Mile of Death. The wreckage found on the highway consisted of at least 28 tanks and other armored vehicles with many more commandeered civilian cars and buses filled with stolen Kuwaiti property. 

The death toll from the attack remains unknown. British journalist Robert Fisk said he "lost count of the Iraqi corpses crammed into the smoldering wreckage or slumped face down in the sand" at the main site and saw hundreds of corpses strewn up the road all the way to the Iraqi border. American journalist Bob Drogin reported seeing "scores" of dead soldiers "in and around the vehicles, mangled and bloated in the drifting desert sands." A 2003 study by the Project on Defense Alternatives (PDA) estimated fewer than 10,000 people rode in the cut-off main caravan, and when the bombing started most simply left their vehicles to escape through the desert or into the nearby swamps where some died from their wounds and some were later taken prisoner. According to PDA, the often repeated low estimate of the numbers killed in the attack is 200–300 reported by journalist Michael Kelly (who personally counted 37 bodies), but a minimum death toll of at least 500–600 seems more plausible.

In 1993, The Washington Post interviewed an Iraqi survivor of the attacks:

Highway 8

Iraqi forces including the elite Iraqi Republican Guard's 1st Armored Division Hammurabi were trying to either redeploy or escape on and near Highway 8, the continuation of Highway 80 in Iraq. They were engaged over a much larger area in smaller groups by U.S. artillery units and a battalion of AH-64 Apache helicopter gunships operating under the command of General Barry McCaffrey. Hundreds of predominantly military Iraqi vehicles grouped in defensive formations of approximately a dozen vehicles were then systematically destroyed along a 50-mile stretch of the highway and nearby desert.

PDA estimated the number killed there to be in the range of 300–400 or more, bringing the likely total number of fatalities along both highways to at least 800 or 1,000. A large column composed of remnants of the Hammurabi Division attempting to withdraw to safety in Baghdad were also engaged and obliterated deep inside Iraqi territory by Gen. McCaffrey's forces a few days later on March 2, in a post-war "turkey shoot"-style incident known as Battle of Rumaila.

Controversies

The attacks were controversial, with some commentators arguing that they represented disproportionate use of force, saying that the Iraqi forces were retreating from Kuwait in compliance with the original UN Resolution 660 of August 2, 1990, and that the column included Kuwaiti hostages and civilian refugees. The refugees were reported to have included women and children family members of pro-Iraqi, PLO-aligned Palestinian militants and Kuwaiti collaborators who had fled shortly before the returning Kuwaiti authorities pressured nearly 200,000 Palestinians to leave Kuwait. Activist and former United States Attorney General Ramsey Clark argued that these attacks violated the Third Geneva Convention, Common Article 3, which outlaws the killing of soldiers who "are out of combat." Clark included it in his 1991 report WAR CRIMES: A Report on United States War Crimes Against Iraq to the Commission of Inquiry for the International War Crimes Tribunal.

Additionally, journalist Seymour Hersh, citing American witnesses, alleged that a platoon of U.S. Bradley Fighting Vehicles from the 1st Brigade, 24th Infantry Division opened fire on a large group of more than 350 disarmed Iraqi soldiers who had surrendered at a makeshift military checkpoint after fleeing the devastation on Highway 8 on February 27, apparently hitting some or all of them. The U.S. Military Intelligence personnel who were manning the checkpoint claimed they too were fired on from the same vehicles and barely fled by car during the incident. Journalist Georgie Anne Geyer criticized Hersh's article, saying that he offered "no real proof at all that such charges—which were aired, investigated and then dismissed by the military after the war—are true."

Before the U.S. Military Police were deployed to guard the wreckage, looting of functional Iraqi weapons took place.

General Norman Schwarzkopf stated in 1995:

According to the Foreign Policy Research Institute, however, "appearances were deceiving":

Photojournalist Peter Turnley published photographs of mass burials at the scene. Turnley wrote:

Time magazine commented:

In popular culture

 In 1991, The Guardian commissioned British anti-war poet Tony Harrison to commemorate the war, and in particular the Highway of Death. His poem, A Cold Coming, began with an ekphrastic representation of a graphic photograph taken on Highway 8 by photojournalist Kenneth Jarecke.
 Iain Banks's 1993 novel Complicity has chapter 12 (of 13) called "Basra Road" and uses the imagery, although not the phrase.
 The 2005 film Jarhead contains a scene in which a group of U.S. Marines come across the Highway of Death.
 In the 2010 video game Tom Clancy's Splinter Cell: Conviction there is a flashback level where a 4-man U.S. Navy SEAL team gets ambushed on the highway.
 In the 2011 video game Battlefield 3 "Thunder Run" mission, the player travels along a similar highway and is attacked by car bombs.
 In the 2019 video game Call of Duty: Modern Warfare, a similarly bombarded road in the fictional middle-eastern country of Urzikstan is named the Highway of Death. In this instance the attack is carried out by Russian forces, which led to accusations against the game of historical revisionism. However, in the game, the targets were civilian, whereas the original event which inspired this game level was largely the Iraqi military being targeted during their withdrawal from Kuwait.

See also
 Battle of the Junkyard
 Death Road (Todesgang)
 Hell's Highway (disambiguation)
 Raate Road
 Operation Mersad
 Battle of Fallujah (2016) – At the end of this battle, U.S. and Iraqi forces performed a similar large-scale bombing campaign against retreating ISIL militants

References

External links

 Photographs of destroyed military equipment taken by a contemporary American serviceman
 Highway of Death photographs taken in 1991 by a Kuwaiti journalist
 A high-resolution map of Kuwait. Highway 80 leads north from Kuwait city, via Al Jahra

1991 in Kuwait
Airstrikes conducted by the United States
Battles of the Gulf War
Roads in Iraq
Roads in Kuwait
History of Kuwait